Austrocylindropuntia floccosa, also called waraqu (Aymara and Quechua for cactus, Hispanicized spelling Huaraco) is found in the high plains of Northern Peru and Bolivia.

Uses

Fences
Waraqu are cultivated for the use of planting them close together to make living fences.

Fruit
The Austrocylindropuntia floccosa fruit is edible.

References

Cacti of South America
Flora of Peru
Flora of Bolivia
Desert fruits
Drought-tolerant plants
Opuntioideae